Vázquez (also spelled Vásquez, Vasques), in non-Spanish-speaking countries often spelled as Vazquez or Vasquez, is an originally Galician surname, in use not only in Galicia but all over the Spanish-speaking world.

Overview
To a lesser extent it also occurs in Portuguese-speaking countries (spelled Vasques), where Vasco is also used as a surname. Vasquez means "[son] of Vasco", and Vasco comes from the pre-Roman latinized name "Velascus", a name of uncertain origin and meaning, but probably Basque or Iberian. In Galician-Portuguese the pre-Roman name becomes Velascu > Veascu > Vaasco > Vasco.

In some Spanish-speaking countries, families of non-Iberian ancestry have also adopted this surname. In Colombia and Argentina, there have been instances of "Watzke" and "Watzka" families, of German-Czech descent, Hispanicizing their surnames to "Vasquez". The surname was chosen as being the one most closely resembling their former name; in Italy a similar phenomenon was noted with some "Watzke" changing to "Vasco".

There are also Spanish cognate surnames Velasco and Velázquez/Velazquez.

List of people with this surname 

 Andrés Vasquez (born 1987), Peruvian-born Swedish football midfielder
 Andrew Vasquez, Native American flute player
 Andrew Vasquez (baseball) (born 1993), American baseball player
 Angélica Delfina Vásquez Cruz (born 1958), Mexican potter 
 Angie Vázquez (born 2001), Mexican singer
 Anthony Vasquez (disambiguation), multiple people
 Camille Vasquez (born 1984), American lawyer known for representing Johnny Depp in the Depp vs Heard civil case
 Catalina Vasquez Villalpando (born 1940), treasurer of the United States
 Chalena Vásquez (1950–2016), Peruvian ethnomusicologist and folklorist
 Christian Vasquez (born 1977), Filipino actor and model
 Christian Vásquez (born 1984), Venezuelan conductor and violinist
 Christian Vázquez (born 1990), Puerto Rican professional baseball catcher
 Christian Vázquez (actor), Mexican actor
 Cristian Vázquez (born 1998), Argentine professional footballer
 Dolors Vázquez Aznar (1955–2014), Spanish painter
 Domingo Vásquez (1846–1909), president of Honduras 1893–1894
 Eric Vasquez (born 1982), American soccer player
 Fabio Vásquez Castaño (1940–2019), Colombian rebel and revolutionary
 Fernando Vásquez (born 1962), Bolivian mining engineer
 Fernando Vázquez (born 1954), Spanish football manager
 Fran Vázquez (born 1983), Spanish basketball player
 Francisco Vásquez de Coronado (1510–1554), Spanish conquistador
 Franco Vázquez (born 1989), Italo-Argentine footballer
 Gabe Vasquez, New Mexico politician
 Gabriel Vásquez (1549–1604), Spanish Jesuit theologian
 Gaddi Vasquez (born 1955), 8th United States Representative to the United Nations Food and Agriculture Organization
 Greivis Vásquez (born 1987), Venezuelan basketball player
 Guillermo Vázquez (born 1967), Mexican footballer and manager
 Guillermo Vázquez (chess player) (born 1997), Paraguayan chess player
 Horacio Vásquez (1860–1936), Dominican general and political figure
 Ignacio Vázquez (footballer, born 1971), Mexican football (soccer) player
 Israel Vázquez (born 1977), Mexican boxer
 Javier Vázquez (born 1976), Puerto Rican-American baseball pitcher
 Jhonen Vasquez (born 1974), Californian cartoonist
 Jorge Vásquez (born 1978), major league baseball pitcher
 Jorge Vázquez (baseball) (born 1982), New York Yankees minor league first baseman
 Jorge Vázquez Viaña (1939–1967), Bolivian revolutionary
 Joseph Vásquez (1962–1995), American independent filmmaker
 Juan Vásquez (composer), Spanish priest and composer of the renaissance
 Juan T. Vázquez Martín (1940–2017), Cuban abstract painter
 Juanes (born 1972), full name Juan Esteban Aristizábal Vásquez (Vásquez is his second, or matrilineal, last name), Colombian rock musician
 Julio César Vásquez (born 1965), Argentine boxer in the super middleweight division
 Junior Vasquez (born 1949), New York City club DJ and remixer/producer
 La La (entertainer) (born 1979), Puerto Rican MTV VJ
 Louis Vásquez (1798–1868), mountain man and trader from Missouri
 Lucas Vásquez de Ayllón (c. 1480–1526), Spanish explorer
 Lucas Vázquez (born 1991), Spanish footballer
 Luis Vásquez (footballer) (born 1996), Colombian football goalkeeper
 Luis Vasquez (American football) (born 1986), American football player
 Manuel Vázquez Gallego (1930–1995), Spanish comic artist and writer
 Manuel Vázquez Montalbán (1939–2003), Spanish writer
 Mario Vazquez (born 1977), New York Puerto Rican singer, from American Idol
 Martín Vásquez (born 1963), Mexican soccer player, also played for US team
 Mona Vasquez (1960–2011), French critic of Scientology
 Myrna Vázquez (1935–1975), Puerto Rican actress and Boston community activist
 Orlando Vásquez (weightlifter, born 1969), Nicaraguan weightlifter
 Ramón Vázquez (born 1976), American baseball player
 Randy Vasquez (born 1961), American actor
 Rafael Vásquez (disambiguation), multiple people
 Rafael Martín Vázquez (born 1965), Spanish footballer
 Roberta Vasquez (born 1963), Cuban-American model, actress and Playboy playmate
 Roberto Vásquez (born 1983), southpaw boxer in the flyweight division
 Sam Vasquez (1972–2007), American MMA fighter
 Sebastián Vázquez (basketball) (born 1985), Uruguayan basketball player
 Tabaré Vázquez (1940–2020), President of Uruguay
 Tiburcio Vásquez (1835–1875), Mexican bandit
 Victor Vazquez (born 1983), better known as Kool A.D., American musician and artist
 Víctor Vázquez (artist), Puerto Rican photographer and conceptual artist
 Víctor Vázquez Rosales (born 1989), Spanish footballer
 Víctor Vázquez Solsona (born 1987), Spanish footballer
 Walter Vásquez Vejarano (born 1932), Peruvian lawyer, politician and President of the Supreme Court
 Wanda Vázquez, Puerto Rico Secretary of Justice, politician and Governor of Puerto Rico

Fictional characters 
 Vasquez, a supporting character from the film Aliens
 Alexandra "Alex" Vasquez, one of the three main characters of the animated television series Totally Spies!
 Esmeralda "Ezzy" Vasquez, a character from the video game Real Heroes: Firefighter
 Jonah Vasquez, a character from the video game Dead by Daylight

References

Galician-language surnames
Spanish-language surnames
Patronymic surnames
Surnames from given names
Surnames of Honduran origin
Surnames of Salvadoran origin
Surnames of Guatemalan origin
Surnames of Puerto Rican origin